Hamid Reza Fathi is an Iranian professional football player currently playing for PAS Hamedan in the Azadegan League.

Career
Fathi joined Naft Tehran F.C. in 2009. He played for Mes Rafsanjan F.C. in the previous two seasons.

References

External sources
 Profile at Persianleague

Living people
Iranian footballers
Persian Gulf Pro League players
Azadegan League players
Mes Rafsanjan players
Naft Tehran F.C. players
1980 births
Association football defenders